The Pennsylvania Match Company, known locally as the Match Factory, was founded in 1899 by Col. W. Fred Reynolds, Joseph L. Montgomery and S. A. Donachy with $200,000 of their own money.

Mr. Donachy owned several patents for match-making machinery and worked as superintendent for the match company Hanover & York prior to their sale.

A  brick building was constructed in Bellefonte, Pennsylvania and production began in 1900. By 1911, the company was one of the eight largest producers of wooden matches in the US.  At its peak during World War II, the factory employed almost 400 and merged with Universal Match Corporation. According to the Bellefonte Historical and Cultural Association, the business "closed in 1947 due to competition from book matches and cigarette lighters."

The red brick buildings were then purchased by lumber and building supply company M. L. Claster & Sons for their General Offices and Bellefonte storage, adding to adjacent land they already owned.  After Clasters was sold to YBC in 1997, the site stood vacant for several years until the American Philatelic Society, looking for more space at lower cost, purchased the complex in 2002, renovated the largest building and relocated from State College. The society then refurbished the adjacent structure, making space available for other commercial tenants, and stated their intention to eventually rehabilitate the remaining buildings.

References

Industrial buildings completed in 1900
Buildings and structures in Centre County, Pennsylvania
Industrial buildings and structures on the National Register of Historic Places in Pennsylvania
1899 establishments in Pennsylvania
1947 disestablishments in Pennsylvania
Manufacturing companies established in 1899
Manufacturing companies disestablished in 1947
National Register of Historic Places in Centre County, Pennsylvania
American companies established in 1899
Defunct manufacturing companies based in Pennsylvania